The Demon-1 is a custom-built biplane for aerobatic flying.

Design and development
The Demon-1 is a single place, conventional landing gear equipped biplane, development of which was started in 2004. The aircraft features nearly full span ailerons. The aircraft is designed to fit on a trailer for transportation between airshows.

Specifications (Demon-1)

See also

References

External links

Youtube Video

Aerobatic aircraft
Homebuilt aircraft